Sadachara Smruti or Hymns of Pious Living is a short work by Sri Madhvacharya, the founder of the Dvaita school of philosophy. The work contains about 35 shlokas. It is essentially an instruction guide for all on the correct routines to follow in leading one's life.

The work provides detailed guidelines on daily activities like:

 Right time to wake up (shloka 1-2)
 First activities to be performed in the morning (shloka 2)
 The right method for a sadhaka to take bath (shloka 3-4)
 The correct mantras and procedure to perform Japa or Sandhyavandanam (shloka 5-8)
 The right attitude while serving God (shloka 9-11)
 Performing worldly duties towards one's job, family and guest (shloka 12-13)
 Performing evening and night duties (Sandhyavandanam) (shloka 14-15)
 Studying Vedas and shastras (shloka 16-21)
 Remembering supreme Lord Narayana always and surrendering all activities to Him (shloka 22-27)
 Duties of four Ashramas (shloka 28-30)
 The equal eligibility for the various Varnas towards worship of Lord Hari/Vishnu (shloka 31)
 Path to Moksha by worshiping supreme Lord Narayana (shloka 32-35)

See also 
 Works of Madhvacharya

References 
  Hymns of Pious Living
 Sri Madhwacharya

Dvaita Vedanta
Hindu texts
Madhvacharya
Sanskrit texts